Yeddi Bolagh (also Romanized as Yeddī Bolāgh; also known as Yeddeh Bolāgh) is a village in Kolah Boz-e Sharqi Rural District, in the Central District of Meyaneh County, East Azerbaijan Province, Iran. At the 2006 census, its population was 154, in 26 families.

References 

Populated places in Meyaneh County